Homesteaders of Paradise Valley is a 1947 American Western film in the Red Ryder film series directed by R. G. Springsteen and written by Earle Snell. The film stars Allan Lane as Red Ryder, Bobby Blake and Martha Wentworth. The film was released on April 1, 1947, by Republic Pictures.

Cast  
 Allan Lane as Red Ryder
 Bobby Blake as Little Beaver
 Martha Wentworth as The Duchess
 Ann Todd as Melinda Hill
 Gene Stutenroth as Bill Hume
 John James as Steve Hill
 Mauritz Hugo as Rufe Hume
 Emmett Vogan as Mr. Langley
 Milton Kibbee as Editor A. C. Blaine
 Tom London as Rancher
 Edythe Elliott as Mrs. Hume
 George Chesebro as Henchman E. J. White
 Edward Cassidy as Sheriff of Center City

References

External links 
 

1947 films
American Western (genre) films
1947 Western (genre) films
Republic Pictures films
Films directed by R. G. Springsteen
Films based on comic strips
Films based on American comics
American black-and-white films
Films shot in Arizona
1940s English-language films
1940s American films
Red Ryder films